For divisional competitions, see: 2010 Asian Five Nations division tournaments

The 2010 Asian Five Nations, known as the 2010 HSBC Asian 5 Nations due to its sponsorship by HSBC, was the third series of the Asian Five Nations, the flagship competition devised by the International Rugby Board (IRB) to develop rugby union in Asia. The top five teams took part in a round-robin competition held on five consecutive weekends between 24 April and 22 May 2010, with each match hosted by one of the participants. Four other divisions operating on a single-elimination basis also took place, with a system of promotion and relegation between the four divisions and the main tournament.

The main tournament was contested by the Arabian Gulf rugby union team, Hong Kong, Japan, Kazakhstan and South Korea. Japan maintained their unbeaten streak within the Asian Five Nations, winning the tournament for the third time in a row, with an average winning margin of over seventy points in their four games. As champions, they qualified for the 2011 Rugby World Cup in New Zealand. Kazakhstan, who placed second with two victories, qualified for the final place play-offs, where they were defeated by Uruguay. Hong Kong and the Arabian Gulf came third and fourth respectively, with two victories each, while Korea were relegated to Division One for the 2011 competition after failing to win a match.

Changes from 2009
 Singapore has been replaced with Arabian Gulf, who earns promotion from Division 1.

Teams
The teams involved, with their world rankings pre tournament, were:

  (44)
  (39)
  (13)
  (26)
  (24)

Final Table

Scoring System
Win  – 5 Points
Draw – 3 Points
Loss – 0 Points
Bonus points for scoring four tries or for losing by no more than 7 points.

Fixtures

NB:
 The Kazakhstan–Japan fixture was moved from Almaty to Tokyo.
 The Arabian Gulf–Korea match was the last Test for the Arabian Gulf team.

References

Division 1

External links
Official Website
ARFU

Asian
2009
Five Nations
Five Nations
2010 in South Korean sport
2010 in Hong Kong sport
2010 in Kazakhstani sport